) was a Japanese sprinter. He competed in the men's 100 metres at the 1936 Summer Olympics. He died at the front in China on 10 July 1939 during the Second Sino-Japanese War while serving as a lieutenant in the Imperial Japanese Army.

References

External links
 

1913 births
1939 deaths
Sportspeople from Saitama Prefecture
Military personnel from Saitama Prefecture
Japanese male sprinters
Olympic male sprinters
Olympic athletes of Japan
Athletes (track and field) at the 1936 Summer Olympics
Japan Championships in Athletics winners
Japanese military personnel killed in action
Military personnel killed in the Second Sino-Japanese War
Imperial Japanese Army officers
20th-century Japanese people